Mushahid Ullah Khan (Urdu:) (30 November 1952 – 18 February 2021) was a Pakistani politician who served as Minister for Climate Change, in Abbasi cabinet from August 2017 to May 2018. A leader of the Pakistan Muslim League (N), Khan had been a member of the Senate of Pakistan since March 2018 and previously served as Minister for Climate Change in the third Sharif ministry in 2015. Mushahid died on 18 February 2021 after a prolonged illness.

Early life and education
Khan was born in 1952 in Rawalpindi. He did his early education at Islamia High School in Rawalpindi and completed graduation at Gordon College in Rawalpindi.

He received L.L.B. degree from Urdu Law College, University of Karachi in 1997.

Political career
He joined Pakistan Muslim League (N) in 1990.

In 2009, Khan was elected to the Senate of Pakistan as a candidate of Pakistan Muslim League (N).

In 2015, Khan was re-elected to the Senate of Pakistan as a candidate of Pakistan Muslim League (N).

In January 2015, he was inducted into the cabinet of then Prime Minister of Pakistan Nawaz Sharif and was appointed chairman of the Benazir Income Support Programme with the status of federal minister. However he did not accept the portfolio. Hence, later he was made Minister for Climate Change.

In August 2015, he was forced to resign as the Minister for Climate Change after he, in an interview to the BBC, alleged that Zaheer-ul-Islam wanted to overthrow the civil and military leadership of Pakistan during the 2014 Azadi march.

In 2017, following the election of Shahid Khaqan Abbasi as Prime Minister of Pakistan, he was inducted into the federal cabinet of Abbasi and was appointed Minister for Climate Change for the second time. Upon the dissolution of the National Assembly on the expiration of its term on 31 May 2018, Khan ceased to hold the office as Federal Minister for Climate Change.

He had been member of Senate of Pakistan from March 2009 until his death in February 2021.

He died on 18 February 2021 in Islamabad Pakistan at the age of 68. He had been bedridden due to his illness.

References

Pakistani senators (14th Parliament)
Pakistan Muslim League (N) politicians
Politicians from Punjab, Pakistan
Government ministers of Pakistan
1952 births
2021 deaths
People from Rawalpindi
Government Gordon College alumni